"Georgia Peaches" is a song written by Blair Daly, Mallary Hope and Rachel Proctor, and recorded by American country music artist Lauren Alaina. It was released in October 24, 2011, as the second single from her debut album Wildflower.

Critical reception
Giving it 4 out of 5 stars, Billy Dukes of Taste of Country said that it "seems custom built for Alaina’s mischievous — yet still wholesome — personality. It’s cute without being sexy." Matt Bjorke of Roughstock gave it an identical rating, saying that it "brings attitude and tempo to the party and immediately showcases Lauren Alaina has the goods to be a big star in country music."

Music video
The music video premiered on January 6, 2012.

Live performances 
Alaina performed the single live on the March 9, 2012 episode of American Idol.

Charts

References

2011 singles
Lauren Alaina songs
Mercury Nashville singles
Song recordings produced by Byron Gallimore
Songs written by Rachel Proctor
Songs written by Blair Daly
Songs about Georgia (U.S. state)
2011 songs